The Sri Lanka Institute of Development Administration (also known as SLIDA) is a research and training institute focusing on public policy and public administration in Sri Lanka. It is operated as a government-operated company through the Ministry of Public Administration and Management and is located in Colombo.

History
The training and development of the Sri Lankan civil service before 1966 came under the purview of the Organization and Methods Division of the Treasury. The 1961 Wilmot A. Perera commission (also known as the 1st Salaries and Cadres Commission) and 1965 Committee for Administrative Reforms both made recommendations that led to the establishment of a dedicated government institute for the purpose in 1966-  the Academy of Administrative Studies at Glen Aber Place, Kollupitiya.

The Academy was renamed the Sri Lanka Institute of Development Administration in 1979, and was incorporated as a state-owned company through the Sri Lanka Institute Of Development Administration Act, No. 9 of 1982.

Directors general

SLIDA
The institute's main purpose is to train public service officers of the Sri Lanka Administrative Service, Sri Lanka Overseas Service and other government agencies. SLIDA is governed by an 11-member Governing Council under the direction of the Ministry of Public Administration and Management, and engages in postgraduate education (via a Master of Public Management), consultancy services and research, and offers training programs that includes diploma-level studies.

References

External links
Ministry of Public Administration and Management
Sri Lanka Institute Of Development Administration Act (No. 9 of 1982)

Government agencies of Sri Lanka
Public administration schools
Graduate schools in Sri Lanka